= Las Cañas, Catamarca =

Coordinates: 28°12′S 65°13′W

Las Cañas (Catamarca)
- Municipality and village
- Interactive map of Las Cañas (Catamarca)
- Country: Argentina
- Province: Catamarca Province
- Time zone: UTC−3 (ART)

Las Cañas (Catamarca) is a village and municipality in Catamarca Province in northwestern Argentina.
